Schinus terebinthifolia is a species of flowering plant in the cashew family, Anacardiaceae, that is native to subtropical and tropical South America. Common names include Brazilian peppertree, aroeira, rose pepper, broadleaved pepper tree, wilelaiki (or wililaiki), Christmasberry tree and Florida holly. The species name has been very commonly misspelled as ‘terebinthifolius’.

Description
Brazilian peppertree is a sprawling shrub or small tree, with a shallow root system, reaching a height of 7–10 m. The branches can be upright, reclining, or nearly vine-like, all on the same plant. Its plastic morphology allows it to thrive in all kinds of ecosystems: From dunes to swamps, where it grows as a semi-aquatic plant. The leaves are alternate, 10–22 cm long, pinnately compound with (3–) 5–152 leaflets; the leaflets are roughly oval (lanceolate to elliptical), 3–6 cm long and 2–3.5 cm broad, and have finely toothed margins, an acute to rounded apex and yellowish veins. The leaf rachis between the leaflets is usually (but not invariably) slightly winged. The plant is dioecious, with small white flowers borne profusely in axillary clusters. The fruit is a drupe 4–5 mm diameter, carried in dense clusters of hundreds.

The two varieties are:
S. terebinthifolia var. acutifolia, leaves to 22 cm, with 7–152 leaflets, pink fruit
S. terebinthifolia var. terebinthifolia, leaves to 17 cm, with 5–132 leaflets, red fruit

Distribution
Schinus terebinthifolia is native to Argentina, Brazil and Paraguay. In the United States, it has been introduced to California, Texas, Hawaii, Arizona, Nevada, Louisiana, and Florida.

Cultivation and uses

Brazilian pepper is widely grown as an ornamental plant in frost-free regions of South America for its foliage and fruit. In its native habitat it is a melliferous flower and is the main source of food for the stingless bee Tetragonisca angustula, which is an important honey producer in Central and South America.

Although it is not a true pepper (Piper), its dried drupes are often sold as pink peppercorns, as are the fruits from the related species Schinus molle (Peruvian peppertree). The seeds can be used as a spice, adding a pepper-like taste to food. They are usually sold in a dry state and have a bright pink color. They are less often sold pickled in brine, where they have a dull, almost green hue.

Planted originally as an ornamental outside of its native range, Brazilian pepper has become widespread and is considered an invasive species in many subtropical regions with moderate to high rainfall, including parts or all of Australia, the Bahamas, Bermuda, southern China, Cuba, Fiji, French Polynesia, Guam, Hawaii, Malta, the Marshall Islands, Mauritius, New Caledonia, New Zealand, Norfolk Island, Puerto Rico, Réunion, South Africa and the United States. In drier areas, such as Israel and southern California, it is also grown, but has not generally proven invasive. In California, it is considered invasive in coastal regions by the California Invasive Plant Council.

Brazilian pepper is hard to control because it produces basal shoots if the trunk is cut. Trees also produce abundant seeds that are dispersed by birds and ants. This same hardiness makes the tree highly useful for reforestation in its native environment, but enables it to become invasive outside of its natural range.

Toxicity
Like many other species in the family Anacardiaceae, Brazilian pepper has an aromatic sap that can cause skin reactions (similar to poison ivy burns) in some sensitive people – although the reaction is usually weaker than that induced by touch of the closely related Lithraea molleoides, known in Brazil as "wild" aroeira (aroeira brava). Conversely, Schinus terebinthifolia is commonly known as "tame" aroeira (aroeira mansa).

In a paper on triterpenes, the ingested fruits are noted to have a “paralyzing effect” on birds. The narcotic and toxic effects on birds and other wildlife has also been noted by others, e.g., Bureau of Aquatic Plant Management. The AMA Handbook of Poisonous and Injurious Plants reports that the triterpenes found in the fruits can result in irritation of the throat, gastroenteritis, diarrhea, and vomiting. Like most other members of the Anacardiaceae, Brazilian pepper contains active alkenyl phenols, e.g., urushiol, cardol, which can cause contact dermatitis and inflammation in sensitive individuals. Contact with the “sap” from a cut or bruised tree can result in rash, lesions, oozing sores, severe itching, welts and reddening and swelling (especially of the eyes).

The burning of plant matter releases many airborne irritants, so it is not an effective means of control. It is said to have a "mace-like" effect upon nearby people and is highly advised against.

History
Also known as "Florida holly", Schinus terebinthifolia was introduced to Florida by at latest 1891, probably earlier, where it has spread rapidly since about 1940, replacing native plants, like mangroves, with thousands of acres occupied. It is especially adept at colonizing disturbed sites and can grow in both wet and dry conditions. Its growth habit allows it to climb over understory trees and invade mature canopies, forming thickets that choke out most other plants.

As an invasive pest
The species, including the seed, is legally prohibited from sale, transport, or planting in Florida, according to the Florida Department of Agriculture and Consumer Services Noxious Weed List. It is classified as a Category I pest by The Florida Exotic Pest Plant Council (FL EPPC). To keep the plant from spreading into native plant communities and displacing them, local regulations and environmental guidelines require eradication of Brazilian pepper wherever possible. The plant and all parts are also illegal for sale or transfer in Texas. As one of the two species sold as pink peppercorn, the other being Schinus molle, it lacks generally recognized as safe (GRAS) status with the FDA.

Several biocontrols are being studied for use in Florida.

It is a declared weed in several states of Australia. In South Africa, it is classified as a category 1 invader in KwaZulu-Natal province, where any plants are to be removed and destroyed, and a category 3 invader in all other provinces, meaning it may no longer be planted.

Control
Two herbicides are approved for use in the United States to exterminate Brazilian pepper: Triclopyr, using the basal bark method; and glyphosate. Picloram can be used if the stump has been freshly cut, but this is neither the preferred nor most effective means of eradication.

Calophya terebinthifolii and Calophya lutea are two psyllids in the Calophya with high specificity – among plants in Florida – for Brazilian peppertree. Thus they are recommended for use in biocontrol in that area.

Medicinal uses

Peppertree is the subject of extensive folk medicinal lore where it is indigenous. Virtually all parts of this tropical tree, including its leaves, bark, fruit, seeds, resin and oleoresin (or balsam) have been used medicinally by indigenous peoples throughout the tropics. The plant has a very long history of use and appears in ancient religious artifacts and on idols among some of the ancient Chilean Amerindians.

Throughout South and Central America, Brazilian peppertree is reported to be an astringent, antibacterial, diuretic, digestive stimulant, tonic, antiviral and wound healer. In Peru, the sap is used as a mild laxative and a diuretic and the entire plant is used externally for fractures and as a topical antiseptic. The oleoresin is used externally as a wound healer, to stop bleeding and for toothaches and it is taken internally for rheumatism and as a purgative. In South Africa, a leaf tea is used to treat colds and a leaf decoction is inhaled for colds, hypertension, depression and irregular heartbeat. In the Brazilian Amazon, a bark tea is used as a laxative and a bark-and-leaf tea is used as a stimulant and antidepressant. In Argentina, a decoction is made with the dried leaves and is taken for menstrual disorders and is also used for respiratory and urinary tract infections and disorders.

Brazilian peppertree is still employed in herbal medicine today in many countries. It is used for many conditions in the tropics, including menstrual disorders, bronchitis, gingivitis, gonorrhea, gout, eye infections, rheumatism, sores, swellings, tuberculosis, ulcers, urethritis, urogenital disorders, venereal diseases, warts and wounds. In Brazilian herbal medicine today, the dried bark and/or leaves are employed for heart problems (hypertension and irregular heart beat), infections of all sorts, menstrual disorders with excessive bleeding, tumors and general inflammation. A liquid extract or tincture prepared with the bark is used internally as a stimulant, tonic and astringent and externally for rheumatism, gout and syphilis.

Recently, the fruit of the plant has been studied and shows promise as a treatment for MRSA. A chemical in the berry appears to stop bacteria from producing a toxin which breaks down tissue. It also appears to suppress the way the bacteria communicate.

Footnotes

References

External links

  —  

 

 

terebinthifolia
Trees of Brazil
Trees of Argentina
Trees of Paraguay
Flora of the Cerrado
Peppers
Plants described in 1820
Flora naturalised in Australia
Garden plants of South America
Ornamental trees
Dioecious plants